NGC 4361 is a planetary nebula in the constellation of Corvus. It is included in the Astronomical League's Herschel 400 Observing Program.

Central star 
NGC 4361's central star is an extremely hot [WC] Wolf-Rayet type star. Its temperature is at 270,000 K, hotter than every classical Wolf–Rayet star known, and it is the hottest known non-neutron star. It is nearly 18,000 times brighter than the Sun, but is only 6.1% its size. This star left the asymptotic giant branch between 5776 and 8018 years ago.

References

External links
 

Corvus (constellation)
Planetary nebulae
4361

Wolf–Rayet stars